The governor of Karnataka, formerly governor of Mysore, is the constitutional head of the Indian state of Karnataka. The governor is appointed by the president of India for a term of five years, and holds office at the president's pleasure. The governor is de jure head of the government of Karnataka; all its executive actions are taken in the governor's name. However, the governor must act on the advice of the popularly elected council of ministers, headed by the chief minister of Karnataka, which thus holds de facto executive authority in the state. The Constitution of India also empowers the governor to act upon his or her own discretion, such as the ability to appoint or dismiss a ministry, recommend President's rule, or reserve bills for the president's assent. Over the years, the exercise of these discretionary powers have given rise to conflict between the elected chief minister and the central government–appointed governor.

Since 1956, eighteen people have served as the governor of Mysore (as the state was known before 1 November 1973) and Karnataka. The first was Maharaja Jayachamarajendra Wadiyar, who was the state's rajpramukh from 1950 to 1956. A majority of Karnataka's governors have been politicians (ten), another five have been civil servants. V. V. Giri went on become the fourth president of India, and Gopal Swarup Pathak the country's fourth vice president. Smt V. S. Ramadevi was the first and only woman governor of Karnataka (1999–2002) and also holds the record of first woman chief election commissioner in india.

Maharaja of Mysore

RajPramukh of Mysore

Governors of Mysore

Governors of  Karnataka

Chief ministers of Karnataka under Governors

References

External links
 
 Succession of Governors
 Karnataka Raj Bhavan Website

 
Karnataka
Governors